Kétvölgy is a village in Vas county, Hungary.
Lived and worked in Kétvölgy Károly Doncsecz potter, Master of folk art.

See also 
 Terézia Zakoucs
 Mátyás Krajczár

External links 
 Street map (Hungarian)

Populated places in Vas County
Hungarian Slovenes